Trinity Christian Academy may refer to:

Trinity Christian Academy (Deltona, Florida)
Trinity Christian Academy (Jacksonville, Florida)
Trinity Christian Academy (Jackson, Tennessee)
Trinity Christian Academy (Addison, Texas)

See also
 Trinity Classical Academy